Mohammad Sanaullah Dar (25 May 1912 – 3 November 1949), better known as Meeraji was an Indian Urdu poet. He lived the life of a bohemian, working only intermittently.

Early life

Born into a Kashmiri family of Gujranwala and named Mohammed Sanaullah Dar, he passed his childhood days in Kucha Sardar Shah, Mozang, Lahore. His father, Munshi Mohammad Mahtabuddin, was a railway engineer, so his family had to often move from one place to another. He lived in Kathiawar, Bostan (Baluchistan), Sanghar and Jacobabad.

Meeraji began composing poetry, under the pseudonym of Sasri, when he was at school. It was from his later encounter with a Bengali girl, Meera Sen, who was a daughter of an accounts officer serving in Lahore, that he fell deeply in love. This left a permanent trace in his life that he adopted his pen name on her name. Though brought up in affluent surroundings, Meeraji left his home and family and chose to lead the life of a homeless wanderer, mostly staying with his friends and making a living by selling his songs. Julien Columeau, a French novelist who also writes in Urdu and Hindi has authored a very unusual but engaging short novel on the life of Meeraji.

Literary life

Meeraji was associated with Adabi Duniya (Lahore), and later worked for All India Radio, Delhi. He wrote literary columns for the monthly Saqi (Delhi) and for a short period helped editing Khayal (Bombay). After Partition, he settled permanently in Bombay.

From his teenage days, Meeraji felt attracted towards Hindu mythology. He often used Hindi vocabulary in his poetry, prose and letters. He acknowledged his debt to the Sanskrit poet Amaru and the French poet Baudelaire. He also translated certain works of the Sanskrit poet, Damodar Gupta and of the Persian poet, Omar Khayyam.

Meeraji is considered to be one of the pioneers of symbolism in Urdu poetry, and especially introducing Free Verse. He also wrote illuminating criticism of poetry and yearned to alter the expression of his age.

Works

Meeraji's literary output was immense but he published very little of his poetry during his lifetime. However, Khalid Hasan, in his article "Meera Sen's forgotten lover," records that during Meeraji's lifetime four collections of Meeraji's works were published by Shahid Ahmed Dehlavi, and one by Maktaba-e-Urdu, Lahore. His complete works Kulliyat-e-Meeraji appeared only in 1988 edited by Dr. Jameel Jalibi.Dr Jameel Jalibi again edited the Kulliyat and published in 1994 from Lahore with all his remaining works. Another collection titled Baqiyat-e-Meeraji was edited by Sheema Majeed in 1990. A book titled "Iss Nazm Mein" containing Essays of Meeraji was published during his lifetime.

The list of the works of Meeraji:
 "Geet he Geet (songs)
 "Meeraji ke Geet" (Poems)
 "Meeraji ki Nazmen"(Poems)
 "Teen Rang" (Poems)
 "Iss Nazm Mein" (Criticism - Essays of Meeraji)
 "Kulliyat-e-Meeraji" (Poems) compiled by Altaf Gauhar and published by Dr. Jameel Jalibi, Urdu Markaz U.K.
 "Baqiyat-e-Meeraji" (Poems) edited by Sheema Majeed and published by Pakistan Books and Literary Sounds, Lahore.
 "Intikhab-e-kalaam"
 "Pratinidhi Shairy"
 "Seh Aatishah (poems)
 "Mashriq o Maghrib ke Naghmay
 "Paband Nazmen (poems)
 "Meera ji ki Nazmen Edited by Anees Nagi (poems)
 "Nigar Khana (translation) 
 "Khemay ke aas Paas (translations)by Meera ji
 "Nagri Nagri fira Musafir Ghar ka rasta Bhool Gaya -Sung By Ghulam Ali

Personality

Meeraji adopted a deliberately outlandish style in his dress, sporting long hair, a dagger-like mustache, oversize earrings, colorful headgear, an amulet and a string of beads around his neck. Mehr Lal Soni Zia Fatehabadi, his poet friend and former class fellow, recalled that the only time Meeraji trimmed his long hair was when he joined All India Radio, New Delhi.

Death

Akhtar ul Iman, his poet friend, who was himself influenced by Meeraji and Noon Meem Rashid, and with whom Meeraji spent the last days of his life in Poona and Bombay, reported that his excessive drinking, cigarette-smoking, and sexual dissipation had drained away his strength and damaged his liver. Then, there came the additional agony of his psychic ailment, for which he had to be admitted to hospital where he was given electric shocks to cure him of his insanity -- a treatment which he dreaded. The end came at 4 p.m. on 3 November 1949, in King Edward Memorial Hospital in Bombay.

Thesis

 "Meeraji" a monograph on the Urdu poet written by Shafey Kidwai.
 "Meeraji : Shakhsiyat aur Funn" - Doctoral dissertation of Dr. Rashid Amjad.
 "Meeraji aur Amli Tanqeed" published by Mah-e-Nau, Lahore in May, 1979. A study of Meeraji's methods of literary criticism.

See also 
 Shabnam Shakeel

References

1912 births
1949 deaths
People from Gujranwala
Writers from Mumbai
Punjabi people
Urdu-language poets
20th-century Indian poets
20th-century Indian male writers
Urdu-language poets from India